Jesús María Araya was a Costa Rican footballer who represented the Costa Rica national football team between 1941 and 1946, scoring eleven goals in nine games.

Career statistics

International

International goals
Scores and results list Costa Rica's goal tally first, score column indicates score after each Costa Rica goal.

References

Date of birth unknown
Date of death unknown
Costa Rican footballers
Costa Rica international footballers
Association football forwards
Orión F.C. players